Giambono di Corrado (15th century) was an Italian painter.

History
He was born in Dubrovnik but moved to Norcia, where he was adopted and was taught by Olivuccio di Ciccarello. Giambono was documented in Norcia in 1442, at work in the choir of Sant’Agostino with a group of painters, including Nicola di Ulisse from Siena; Luca di Lorenzo (Luca Alemanno) from Germany; Bartolomeo di Tommaso of Foligno; and Andrea de Litio.

References

External links
Intorno a Bartolomeo di Tommaso, Ricerche sulla “Scuola di Ancona”, article by Matteo Mazzalupi.

1400s births
1400s deaths
15th-century Italian painters
Italian male painters
Umbrian painters